Morven railway station is located on the Western line in Queensland, Australia. It serves the town of Morven. The station has one platform.

Services
Morven is served by Queensland Rail Travel's twice weekly Westlander service travelling between Brisbane and Charleville.

References

External links

Morven station Queensland's Railways on the Internet

Regional railway stations in Queensland
South West Queensland
Western railway line, Queensland